Kafeh Jangian (also Romanized as Kāfeh Jangīān) is a village in Abreis Rural District, Bazman District, Iranshahr County, Sistan and Baluchestan Province, Iran. At the 2006 census, its population was 27, in 7 families.

References 

Populated places in Iranshahr County